Uruguay competed at the 1992 Summer Olympics in Barcelona, Spain. Sixteen competitors, all men, took part in fifteen events in eleven sports.

Competitors
The following is the list of number of competitors in the Games.

Athletics

Men's Marathon
 Nelson Zamora — 2:25.32 (→ 54th place)
 Ricardo Vera

Boxing

 Jorge Porley
 Luis Méndez

Canoeing

 Enrique Leite

Cycling

Two cyclists represented Uruguay in 1992.

Men's road race
 Federico Moreira
 Sergio Tesitore

Judo

 Jorge Steffano

Modern pentathlon

One male pentathlete represented Uruguay in 1992.

Men's Individual Competition:
 Daniel Pereyra — 2929 points (→ 66th place)

Rowing

 Jesús Posse

Sailing

 Ricardo Fabini
 Luis Chiapparro
 Nicolás Parodi

Shooting

 Fernando Richeri

Swimming

Men's 100m Breaststroke
 Gustavo Gorriarán
 Heat — 1:05.79 (→ did not advance, 40th place)

Men's 200m Breaststroke
 Gustavo Gorriarán
 Heat — 2:21.25 (→ did not advance, 30th place)

Weightlifting

See also
 Uruguay at the 1991 Pan American Games

References

External links
 Montevideo.com

Nations at the 1992 Summer Olympics
1992
Olympics